Priory Country Park is a country park located in the Newnham area of Bedford, England alongside the River Great Ouse. The park is managed by Bedford Borough Council.

The park was established after gravel extraction ended in 1977. It was officially opened in 1986 by Valerie Singleton. It covers an area of 300 acres (121 hectares), with habitats including lakes, grassland and woodland. It includes the Priory Marina and Cardington Artificial Slalom Course. There is also a Beefeater Grill and Premier Inn by the park entrance.

Priory Country Park won a Green Flag Award in 2007.

The wall alongside the Marina is constructed from the stones once part of the former Augustinian Monastery that occupied that part of the site. It also contains Roman bricks from an earlier Roman farm house that preceded it.

See also
 Bedford Park

References

External links 

 Flora and Fauna of Priory Country Park, Bedford
 Priory Country Park (blog)
 Priory Sailing Club
 Cardington Artificial Slalom Course (CASC)
 Priory Marina

Country parks in Bedfordshire
Nature reserves in Bedfordshire
Bedford
1986 establishments in England